Barbara Stuart is a specialist in spectroscopy.

Background
Stuart studied her B.Sc. at the University of Sydney in 1987, tutoring at the university for 3 years, then studied a M.Sc. biophysical chemistry, graduating in 1990. Stuart then moved to the UK and studied a PhD in polymer engineering at Imperial College London, graduating in 1993. Stuart then began lecturing in Physical Chemistry at the University of Greenwich for 2 years before returning to Australia to lecture at the University of Technology Sydney.

Publications
Stuart has published Biological Applications of Infrared Spectroscopy in 1997, Infrared Spectroscopy: Fundamentals and Applications in 2004, Analytical techniques in materials conservation in 2007 Polymer Analysis in 2008, and Forensic Analytical Techniques in 2012.

References

External links

Academic staff of the University of Technology Sydney
CSIRO people
Living people
Year of birth missing (living people)
University of Sydney alumni
Alumni of Imperial College London
Spectroscopists